Baabar (born Bat-Erdeniin Batbayar [] in Tsetserleg, Arkhangai, in 1954) is a Mongolian retired politician, political analyst and writer.

Education
1972 Graduated from a high school in Ulan-Bator
1972–1973 Attended a preparatory course at the Mongolian State University
1973–1980 Studied at the Jagiellonian University, Kraków, Poland until he was transferred to Mongolian State University which he graduated in 1981 majoring in biochemistry.
1987–1989 Studied at the Moscow State University, Soviet Union.
1990 Scholarship at The Imperial College of Science, Technology and Medicine, London, United Kingdom.

Career
Baabar worked at the Microbiological Research and Production Center as a Researcher in 1981–1991 until he became the Leader of the Mongolian Social Democratic Party. He resigned as the Leader of the Mongolian Social Democratic Party in 1994.

Baabar was elected to the State Great Hural of Mongolia in 1996. From 1998 to 1999, he was Minister of Finance.

After being defeated at the 2004 parliamentary election, he worked as Foreign Policy Advisor to Prime Minister in 2004–2005.

Since 2006, he has been running Nepko Publishing Company.

In 2009, he was awarded with the State Awards of Mongolia for History of Mongolia.

Publications

Buu Mart. Martval Sonono (Don't Forget. Otherwise, We'll Be Doomed), 1989
History of Mongolia, 1996

References

Members of the State Great Khural
1954 births
Living people
Alumni of Imperial College London
Jagiellonian University alumni
Finance ministers of Mongolia
Government ministers of Mongolia
Moscow State University alumni
Mongolian expatriates in Poland
Mongolian expatriates in the Soviet Union
Mongolian expatriates in the United Kingdom
Mongolian Social Democratic Party politicians
National University of Mongolia alumni
People from Arkhangai Province